The Minister of Health and Local Government was a member of the Executive Committee of the Privy Council of Northern Ireland (Cabinet) in the Parliament of Northern Ireland which governed Northern Ireland from 1922 to 1972.  The post was created in 1944 and was renamed Minister of Health and Social Services in 1965.

Parliamentary Secretary to the Ministry of Health and Local Government/Health and Social Services
1944 Sir Wilson Hungerford
1944 - 1948 vacant
1948 – 1953 Terence O'Neill
1953 – 1955 vacant
1955 – 1956 Terence O'Neill
1956 – 1963 vacant
1963 – 1964 Brian McConnell
1964 - 1965 William Fitzsimmons
1965 - 1971 vacant
1971 - 1972 Joseph Burns
1972 office abolished

References
The Government of Northern Ireland

1944 establishments in Northern Ireland
1972 disestablishments in Northern Ireland
Executive Committee of the Privy Council of Northern Ireland